Mount Blair is a small but conspicuous mountain,  high, standing  northwest of Mount Weihaupt in the Outback Nunataks, Victoria Land, Antarctica. The topographical feature was first mapped by the United States Geological Survey from surveys and from U.S. Navy air photos, 1959–64, and named by the Advisory Committee on Antarctic Names for Terence T. Blair, former biologist who contributed to his biological studies at McMurdo Station, Hut Point Peninsula, Ross Island, during the Summer of 1966–67. The mountain lies on the Pennell Coast, a portion of Antarctica lying between Cape Williams and Cape Adare.

References 

Mountains of Victoria Land
Pennell Coast